Alois Faigle (born 1898, date of death unknown) was a Swiss bobsledder. He competed in the four-man event at the 1924 Winter Olympics.

References

1898 births
Year of death missing
Swiss male bobsledders
Olympic bobsledders of Switzerland
Bobsledders at the 1924 Winter Olympics
Place of birth missing
20th-century Swiss people